George MacKenzie (21 November 1888 – 27 June 1957) was a wrestler from Islington.

Mackenzie became British lightweight champion in 1909, winning the title again in 1912, 1922, 1924, 1932, and 1941. Additionally, he held the featherweight title in 1921 and 1922. He lost the title to W Schneeberger in 1923, but regained the title in 1924. He was a leading member and coach of the Pentonville-based Ashdown Club, the premier British wrestling association of the period.

Mackenzie competed in the 1908 Olympics, finishing fourth. He competed in four further Olympics in total, up to 1928. He officiated at an additional four, and was chosen to carry the UK flag in the opening ceremony of the 1956 Olympics. He died of lung cancer in 1957.

References

External links
 

1880s births
1956 deaths
People from Islington (district)
Olympic wrestlers of Great Britain
Wrestlers at the 1908 Summer Olympics
Wrestlers at the 1912 Summer Olympics
Wrestlers at the 1920 Summer Olympics
Wrestlers at the 1924 Summer Olympics
Wrestlers at the 1928 Summer Olympics
British male sport wrestlers
Deaths from lung cancer
Sportspeople from London